Juan Sánchez or Sanchez may refer to:

Arts and entertainment
Juan Sánchez Cotán (1560–1627), Spanish Baroque painter
Juan Félix Sánchez (1900–1997), Andean folk artist
Juan Sánchez Peláez (1922–2003), Venezuelan poet
Juan Sanchez (artist), (born 1954), American painter
Juan Ramón Sánchez (actor) (1957–2008), Spanish actor
Juan Sánchez-Villalobos Ramírez, character from Highlander

Politics and law
Juan Sánchez Ramírez (1762–1811), Dominican soldier and politician (for whom Sánchez Ramírez Province is named)
Juan Manuel Sánchez, Duke of Almodóvar del Río (1850–1906), Spanish noble and politician
Juan Manuel Sánchez Gordillo (born 1952), Spanish politician
Juan Ramon Sánchez (born 1955), U.S. federal judge

Sports

Association football (soccer)
Juan Ramón Sánchez (born 1952), Salvadoran footballer and football manager
Juan Carlos Sánchez (born 1956), Bolivian football striker
Juan Sánchez (footballer, born 1972), Spanish footballer
Juan Carlos Sánchez Ampuero (born 1985), Bolivian footballer
Juan Sánchez Sotelo (born 1987), Argentine footballer
Juan Sánchez Miño (born 1990), Argentine footballer
Juan Sánchez (soccer, born 1997), American soccer player
Juan Sánchez (footballer, born 1998), Mexican footballer

Other sports
Juan Sánchez (cyclist) (born 1938), Spanish Olympic cyclist
Juan Manuel Sánchez (born 1962), Spanish sprint canoeist
Juan Ignacio Sánchez (born 1977), Argentine basketball player
Juan Carlos Sánchez Jr. (born 1991), Mexican boxer

Others
Juan Sánchez Duque de Estrada (1581–1641), Spanish bishop
Juan Sánchez-Navarro y Peón (1913–2006), Mexican businessman, ideologue
Juan Sánchez Muliterno (born 1948), Spanish professor
Juan Sánchez Vidal (born 1958), Spanish model aircraft collector

Other uses 
Juan Sánchez, Bayamón, Puerto Rico, a settlement in the Municipality of Bayamón, Puerto Rico
Dr. Juan Sanchez Acevedo Coliseum, Puerto Rican stadium

See also
Juan Boza Sánchez (1941–1991), gay Afro-Cuban-American artist 
Juan Carlos (footballer, born 1987) (born 1987), Spanish footballer